Always Greener was an Australian television drama/comedy series that aired on the Seven Network which followed the fortunes of two families, one from the city and the other from the country, when they decide to switch homes and start a new direction in life for themselves. It ran from 2001 until 2003, when it was cancelled after declining ratings and concerns over the cost of production.

History
The name of the show stems from the phrase "The grass is always greener on the other side". Promotion of the show's premiere episode used the Travis song "Side", which features the phrase as part of the chorus. The show was broadcast overseas in New Zealand on TV ONE. In 2006 reruns started airing on TV2. The series has since been released on DVD.

The Southern Star Group owns the rights to distribute Always Greener internationally.

Premise
The series mainly revolved around the members of two families, the Taylors, who live in suburban Sydney, and the Todd family who live on a farm just outside the rural New South Wales town of Inverness. Each faced with problems of their own, John Taylor pays his sister Sandra Todd a Christmas visit to her farm. Joking that they should consider switching houses for a change in their life, the move becomes a reality when John discovers that his daughter Marissa is on drugs and Sandra can't pay the bills. Always Greener was noted for both dealing with serious issues as well as putting an often humorous touch to episodes. Fantasy sequences (such as a song and dance number when John mulls over having a vasectomy) were common and often added to the charm of the series.

Cast

The Taylor family
John Howard - John Taylor
Anne Tenney - Liz Taylor
Michala Banas - Marissa Taylor
Daniel Bowden - Jason Taylor
Natasha Lee - Kimberley Taylor

The Todd family
Caitlin McDougall - Sandra Todd
Bree Walters - Pip Todd
Abe Forsythe - Campbell Todd

Other main characters
Scott Major - Tom Morgan
Andrew Clarke - Derek Unn
Merridy Eastman - Eileen Unn
Denise Roberts - Isabelle Turnbull
Georgie Shew - Katy Turnbull
Peter Corbett - Bert Adams
Bree Desborough - Shelley Southall
Clayton Watson - Mickey Steele
Grant Bowler - Greg Steele (Episodes 1 - 27)
Nathaniel Dean - Craig 'Patch' Porter (Episodes 9 - 50)
Steven Rooke - Nick Greenhill (Episodes 16 - 50)

Ratings

Awards
Clayton Watson won the Australian Film Institute's award for "Best Actor in a Supporting or Guest Role in a Television Drama" for his work on Always Greener in 2002. The show was also nominated for an International Emmy Award in 2002 and Always Greener and its cast have been nominated for several Logies during its run.

Logie Awards

2003 Nominee: Most Outstanding Drama Series
2003 Nominee: Most Outstanding Actor in a Drama Series (John Howard)
2002 Nominee: Most Outstanding Drama Series
2002 Nominee: Most Popular New Female Talent (Michala Banas)

ASSG Australian Screen Sound Awards

2003 Nominee: Best Achievement in Sound for a Television Drama ("Episode 50")

APRA-AGSC Screen Music Awards

2002 Nominee: Best Music for a Television Series or Serial (Paul Healy and Trent Williamson)

Australian Film Institute Television Awards

2002 Winner: Best Actor in a Supporting or Guest Role in a Television Drama (Clayton Watson)

International Emmy Awards

2002 Nominee: Always Greener Series 1 - Eps. 1 & 3

Australian Writers' Guild Awards

2002 Nominee: Television (Series): "The Good Woman's Guide To A Happy Home" (Sue Hore)

Cancellation
On 6 July 2003, Seven's Director of Programming and Production, Tim Worner announced the renewal of Always Greener saying: "Always Greener is an important program for Seven. We see it as a key franchise for us, a program we believe will continue to build in its third season." Then in September, the decision was reversed. News was broken to cast and crew as the first script meetings for the new series were already being held.

Rumours were that the cancellation was due to falling ratings. The show began with over 2 million viewers in 2001, but ratings never recovered from the disastrous decision to début the second season in the low rating Easter period of 2002 - Against stronger competition in both '60 Minutes' and 'Big Brother'.  In 2002 the show moved from Sunday to Monday and then back to Sunday by 2003. Always Greener was rating around 1.0 million when cancelled. However, Seven cited "cost management" as the reason for dropping the series.

At the time, Worner was reported as saying that the decision was purely based on cost, because the 22 episodes were to cost $10 million, and he said that was far too much.

In late 2005 Seven aired reruns of the show in the early morning 9.30am timeslot and again in Seven's popular reruns timeslot at 12.00pm. Presently it airs sporadically on Universal Channel.

Home media

The first season of Always Greener have been released on DVD in Region 4 (Australia) format. The DVDs are distributed by Madman Entertainment under the label of VIA Vision Entertainment. A photo gallery is included in Season 1 (Vol. 2) and Season 1 (Complete).

See also
 List of Australian television series

References

External links
 
Always Greener at the Australian Television Information Archive
Always Greener at the National Film and Sound Archive
 Always Greener on 7plus

Australian drama television series
Television shows set in New South Wales
Seven Network original programming
2001 Australian television series debuts
2003 Australian television series endings
English-language television shows
Television series by Endemol Australia